Hypoderidae is a family of mites belonging to the order Astigmata.

Genera:
 Alcedinectes Fain, 1966
 Amazonectes Fain, 1967
 Apodidectes Mironov & OConnor, 2013
 Aradectes Fain, 1966
 Bubulcodectes Fain & Lukoschus, 1986
 Collocalidectes Mironov & OConnor, 2013
 Colobathryglyphus Fain & Nadchatram, 1982
 Dipodomydectes Fain & Lukoschus, 1978
 Gypsodectes Fain, 1984
 Hypodectes de Filippi, 1862
 Ibisidectes Fain & Laurence, 1974
 Muridectes Fain, 1968
 Neottialges Fain, 1966
 Neotytodectes OConnor, 1981
 Passerodectes Fain, 1966
 Phalacrodectes Fain, 1966
 Picidectes Fain, 1967
 Thalassornectes Fain, 1966
 Tytodectes Fain, 1966

References

Acari